Oriental Sports Center formerly known as Jiyang Road is an interchange station between Lines 6, 8 and 11 of the Shanghai Metro. It is the first cross-platform interchange in Shanghai as well as the southern terminus of Line 6; it is also the first station in Pudong when heading southeast-bound on Line 11 towards .

The station opened as an interchange station between lines 6 and 8 on 20 April 2010. Due to previous constructions on Line 11 and the nearby sports stadium, the station only allowed line transfers and exits to the surface only opened on 12 April 2011. From 31 August 2013 line 11 also operated this station.

Station Layout

Surrounding area
Shanghai Oriental Sports Center

References

Railway stations in Shanghai
Shanghai Metro stations in Pudong
Railway stations in China opened in 2010
Pudong
Line 6, Shanghai Metro
Line 8, Shanghai Metro
Line 11, Shanghai Metro